The National Football League playoffs for the 1978 season began on December 24, 1978. The postseason tournament concluded with the Pittsburgh Steelers defeating the Dallas Cowboys in Super Bowl XIII, 35–31, on January 21, 1979, at the Orange Bowl in Miami.

This was the first year that the playoffs expanded to a ten-team format, adding a second wild card team (a fifth seed) from each conference. The two wild card teams from each conference (the 4 and 5 seeds) played each other in the first round, called the "Wild Card Playoffs." The division winners (seeds 1, 2, and 3) automatically advanced to the Divisional Playoffs, which became the second round of the playoffs.

However, the league continued to prohibit meetings between two teams from the same division in the divisional playoffs. Thus, there could be times when the pairings in that round would be the no. 1 seed vs. the no. 3 seed and no. 2 vs. no. 4.

Participants

Bracket

Schedule
In the United States, CBS televised the NFC playoff games, while NBC broadcast the AFC games and Super Bowl XIII.

Wild Card playoffs

Sunday, December 24, 1978

NFC: Atlanta Falcons 14, Philadelphia Eagles 13

This was a matchup of two teams that had ended prolonged postseason droughts.  The Falcons were in the playoffs for the first time in their 13-year history while the Eagles were playing their first playoff game since their victory in the 1960 NFL Championship Game.

Philadelphia had been decimated by problems at the placekicker position all year long.  Starting kicker Nick Mike-Mayer had made just 8 of 17 field goal attempts before suffering a season-ending injury in week 12.  To replace him, coach Dick Vermeil used punter Mike Michel.  Michel had done some placekicking in college, so Vermeil assigned him both roles.  This did not pay off, as Michel missed 3 of 12 extra points during the remainder of the season, performing so poorly that the Eagles started attempting fourth down conversions deep in opponent territory rather than field goals.  Coming into this playoff game, Michel had not attempted a single field goal, and the Eagles' issues in the kicking game played a decisive role in their loss.  Coincidentally, the Falcons kicker in this game, rookie Tim Mazzetti, had been cut by Philadelphia in the preseason.

The Falcons won their first playoff game in team history after they overcame a 13–0 deficit by scoring 2 touchdowns in the final 5 minutes of the game. In the first quarter, Philadelphia's Cleveland Franklin recovered a fumble from Billy Ryckman on a punt return at the Falcons 13-yard line, setting up wide receiver Harold Carmichael's 13-yard touchdown reception from Ron Jaworski. However, Michel missed the ensuing extra point, which later became costly.

Neither team scored again until the third quarter when the Eagles took advantage of another Atlanta special teams miscue, this time a dismal 17-yard punt by John James that gave them a first down on their 40-yard line.  Aided by a roughing the passer penalty and a pair of receptions by Charlie Smith, Jaworski led the team 60 yards to score on Wilbert Montgomery's 1-yard rushing touchdown.  Michel's extra point was partially deflected, but still went in to give the Eagles a 13–0 lead.  Later in the period, Michel had a chance to put the team up by three scores, but he missed a 42-yard field goal attempt, the first field goal kick of his career.

Still, the Eagles seemed in control of the game going into the fourth quarter.  And with 9:52 left, they appeared to be in prime position to secure a win when cornerback Bobby Howard intercepted Falcons QB Steve Bartkowski's pass, the 5th turnover of the day for Atlanta.  The Eagles then moved the ball to Atlanta's 15-yard line, but with 8:16 to go, linebacker Fulton Kuykendall recovered a fumble from fullback Mike Hogan on the 13.  A few plays later, faced with second down and 10 on the 26, Bartkowski launched a deep pass to Wallace Francis, who was tightly covered by defensive back Herm Edwards.  Both players went up for the ball and came down with it, resulting in a simultaneous catch between each of them.  Under NFL rules, a simultaneous catch goes to the receiver, so Atlanta kept the ball and gained 49 yards in what turned out to be a decisive play.  Three plays later, Bartkowski found tight end Jim Mitchell wide open in the end zone for a 20-yard touchdown pass, cutting the score to 13–7 at 4:56.

The Eagles went three-and-out on their next possession and had to punt ball back to the Falcons.  Franklin tackled Ryckman for a 5-yard loss on the return, but committed a 15-yard facemask penalty in the process, giving Atlanta the ball on their 49-yard line.  After 5 plays, Atlanta had moved only 12 yards.  Faced with a crucial 3rd and 10 situation, Bartkowski went deep to Francis again, this time connecting with the receiver as he evaded safety Randy Logan to score on a 37-yard touchdown completion.  With Mazzetti's extra point, the Falcons took their first lead of the game, 14–13, with 1:37 left in the game.

The Eagles had one last shot to win the game as Jaworski completed four passes to get them to Atlanta's 16-yard line with 13 seconds remaining, but Michel missed a 34-yard field goal attempt and the Falcons ran out the rest of the clock.

Bartkowski completed 18/32 passes for 243 yards and two touchdowns, with two interceptions.  His top target was Francis, who caught 6 passes for 135 yards and a touchdown.  Jaworski completed 19/35 passes for 190 yards and a touchdown.  The Eagles leading receiver was Smith, who caught 7 passes for 108 yards.  This was and to this day remains the only playoff game to feature two Polish-born starting quarterbacks (Bartkowski and Jaworski were born in the USA of Polish descent).  Michel was released by the Eagles in the offseason after this game and never played in the NFL again.

This was the first postseason meeting between the Eagles and Falcons.

AFC: Houston Oilers 17, Miami Dolphins 9

Quarterback Dan Pastorini led the Oilers to an upset victory by passing for 306 yards.  Houston outgained the Dolphins in total yards, 455-209, and forced 5 turnovers while only losing one on their end.

Miami managed to keep Houston running back Earl Campbell well contained in the first half, limiting him to just 16 yards on 13 carries, but they were unable to handle the passing attack of Pastorini, who completed 16 of 21 passes for 261 yards during that time.  Meanwhile, Dolphins quarterback Bob Griese completed just 6 of 16 passes in the first two quarters.

The Dolphins scored first after Earnie Rhone recovered a fumbled punt from Robert Woods at the Houston 21-yard line, setting up quarterback Bob Griese's 13-yard touchdown pass to tight end Andre Tillman. However, the Oilers responded with an 11-play, 71-yard drive in which Pastorini completed 6 of 7 passes for 66 yards, the last one a 13-yard touchdown pass to running back Tim Wilson. Neither team scored again until the fourth quarter, despite several chances.  In the second quarter, Pastorini completed a 55-yard pass to tight end Mike Barber on the Dolphins 9-yard line, but the drive ended with no points when Toni Fritsch's 28-yard field goal attempt was blocked by linebacker Kim Bokamper.  The Oilers later drove to the Dolphins red zone with 14 seconds left in the half.  On the next play, Pastorini completed a pass to Ken Burrough, but he was tackled short of the end zone and the clock ran out before the team could spike the ball to stop it.

In the third quarter, Miami blew a chance to take then lead when Garo Yepremian drove a 38-yard field goal attempt wide left.  In the final period, Toni Fritsch made a 35-yard field goal to give the Oilers a 10-7 lead. Then linebacker Gregg Bingham intercepted a pass from Griese and returned it 4 yards to midfield.  Campbell finally managed to get into gear with a 20-yard run on the ensuing drive, and eventually finished it off with a 1-yard rushing touchdown. The Dolphins closed out the scoring, but only when Pastorini ran out of the end zone for an intentional safety to run out the clock.

Despite his poor first half, Campbell finished the game with 84 rushing yards and a 13-yard reception.  Wilson rushed for 76 yards and caught 5 passes for 40.  Barber had 112 yards on 4 receptions, while Burroughs caught 6 passes for 103.  Griese finished the game just 11/28 for 114 yards, with a touchdown and two interceptions.

This was the first postseason meeting between the Oilers and Dolphins.

Divisional playoffs

Saturday, December 30, 1978

AFC: Pittsburgh Steelers 33, Denver Broncos 10

The Steelers dominated the Broncos by gaining 425 yards of total offense, and dominated Denver starting quarterback Craig Morton so effectively that his team gained just 49 yards on their first five possessions before he was replaced by Norris Weese in the second quarter, who ended up getting sacked 5 times. 

After Denver scored first on a field goal, Pittsburgh responded by driving 66 yards in 8 plays to score on running back Franco Harris' 1-yard touchdown run, giving the team a 6-3 lead after Roy Gerela missed the extra point. Then on the Steelers' next drive, Harris ran 18 yards to the end zone for his second touchdown.  In the second quarter, the Steelers increased their lead to 16-3 with Gerela's 24-yard field goal.  However, linebacker Tom Jackson later recovered a fumble from Pittsburgh quarterback Terry Bradshaw on the Steelers 49-yard line, where the Broncos went on to score on Dave Preston's 3-yard touchdown run that made the score 16-10.  The Steelers responded with Gerela's second field goal of the day to take a 19-10 lead going into halftime.

In the third quarter, Denver mounted their most promising drive of the day, advancing the ball 73 yards.  But it ended with no points when Joe Greene blocked Jim Turner's 29-yard field goal attempt.  In the fourth quarter, Bradshaw threw two touchdowns, the first a 45-yarder to wide receiver John Stallworth.  Then Dennis Winston recovered a fumble from Denver's Rick Upchurch on the ensuing kickoff, setting up Bradshaw's 38-yard touchdown pass. to wide receiver Lynn Swann. 

Bradshaw completed 16 of 29 passes for 272 yards and 2 touchdowns, Stallworth had 10 receptions for 156 yards and a touchdown, and Harris rushed for 105 yards and 2 touchdowns.

This was the second postseason meeting between the Broncos and Steelers, which Denver won last year's meeting.

NFC: Dallas Cowboys 27, Atlanta Falcons 20

After losing three fumbles and their starting quarterback due to injury in the first half, Dallas rallied back from a 7-point deficit with two touchdowns in the second half to secure the win.

Cowboys quarterback Roger Staubach converted a 3rd and 16 with a 39-yard completion to Drew Pearson as he led the team 57 yards in 12 plays score on their opening drive with a 34-yard field goal by Rafael Septién. Atlanta responded by driving 78 yards in 8 plays to take a 7-3 lead with Bubba Bean's 14-yard touchdown run.  On the first play of the next possession, Staubach completed an 18-yard pass to tight end Jackie Smith.  Three plays later, punter/reserve quarterback Danny White kept the drive going with a 12-yard run on a fake punt, and Scott Laidlaw ran for a 21-yard gain on the next play.  Laidlaw eventually finished the 10-play, 76 yard drive with a 13-yard touchdown run, giving Dallas a 10-7 lead.

Atlanta had to punt on their next drive, but Butch Johnson muffed the kick and Tom Moriarty recovered the ball for the Falcons on the Dallas 25-yard line.  Three plays later, Tim Mazzetti kicked a 42-yard field goal to tie the game at 10 roughly a minute into the second quarter.  Dallas responded by driving 46 yards in 10 plays to take a 13-10 lead with a 48-yard field goal from Septién. But Atlanta got a big break on the ensuing kickoff when a 15-yard personal foul penalty against Dallas turned Dennis Pearson's 36-yard return into a 51-yard gain and gave them the ball on the Cowboys 40-yard line.  From there, Atlanta scored on a 7-play drive, the last one a 17-yard touchdown pass from Steve Bartkowski to Wallace Francis that gave the team a 17-13 lead.  Dallas barely avoided disaster when they muffed the ensuing kickoff, managing to recover the ball in the end zone for a touchback.  But on the next play, Tony Dorsett lost a fumble while being hit by Greg Brezina, and Falcons linebacker Dewey McClain recovered it on the Cowboys 30-yard line.  The Dallas defense managed to keep Atlanta out of the end zone, but Mazzetti kicked a 22-yard field goal to give them a 20-13 lead with 50 seconds left in the half.  Dallas then drove to the Falcons 35-yard line, but lost the ball on a fumbled snap in shotgun formation that was recovered by defensive back Tom Pridemore.  To make matters worse for Dallas, Staubach was knocked out of the game on the drive due to a massive hit from linebacker Robert Pennywell, though they did manage to prevent Atlanta from scoring as a result of an interception by Randy Hughes.

Atlanta had to punt from deep in their territory on their opening drive of the second half, and Johnson returned it to the Falcons 49-yard line.  Still, Dallas was unable to capitalize, as they lost their fourth turnover of the day, this time a pass from White that was intercepted by Rolland Lawrence.  Still, Dallas quickly forced a punt and again achieved excellent field position as Johnson returned it 8 yards to their 46-yard line.  Then White completed passes to Billy Joe Dupree and Laidlaw for gains of 24 and 15 yards as the team drove 54 yards in seven plays to tie the game, 20-20, on his 2-yard touchdown pass to Smith.  Later on, Bartkowski threw a pass that was deflected by Cliff Harris and intercepted by defensive back Aaron Kyle, who returned it 15 yards to the Falcons 41-yard line.  

On the next play, the last of the third quarter, Dupree took the ball on an end around play and ran for a 20-yard gain.  Still, the Falcons defense managed to prevent a score, stopping the Cowboys over the next three plays before Septién missed a 31-yard field goal attempt.  The next time Dallas got the ball, a bad Falcons punt gave them a first down on the Atlanta 30-yard line, where they drove to a 27-20 lead on Laidlaw's 1-yard touchdown run.  The Cowboys defense then went on to dominate Atlanta for the rest of the game.  After a punt from each team, Atlanta mounted a drive inside the Dallas 35-yard line, only to lose the ball when failing to convert a 4th and 1.  The Falcons forced a punt and got one last chance to drive for a tying touchdown with 59 seconds and all three timeouts left.  But Harris put an end to that prospect by intercepting a pass from Bartkowski and returning it 22 yards.

Laidlaw rushed for 66 yards and 2 touchdowns, while also catching a pass for 15. Dorsett rushed for 65 yards.  Dupree caught 5 passes for 59 yards and rushed for 20.  Bartkowski was held to just 8 of 23 completions for 95 yards, with 1 touchdown and 3 interceptions.

This was the first postseason meeting between the Falcons and Cowboys.

Sunday, December 31, 1978

AFC: Houston Oilers 31, New England Patriots 14

Quarterback Dan Pastorini led the Oilers to a victory by throwing for 200 yards and three touchdowns, while running back Earl Campbell rushed for 118 yards and a score.

After a scoreless first quarter, Houston completely took over the game.  Houston receiver Ken Burrough caught a pass from Pastorini at the Pats 40-yard, broke through coverage from Mike Haynes, and took off for a 71-yard touchdown reception.  Raymond Clayborn's 47-yard kickoff return gave the Patriots a chance to strike back, but two plays later, Steve Grogan's pass on a flea flicker play was intercepted by Mike Reinfeldt on the Oilers 1-yard line.  Aided by an unnecessary roughness penalty that gave them a first down after failing to convert a 3rd down on their own 7-yard line, Houston drove 99 yards to score on Pastorini's 19-yard touchdown pass to tight end Mike Barber.  Again, the Patriots seemed ready to respond, driving to the Oilers 23-yard line, but again they came up short due to Reinfeldt, who intercepted another pass from Grogan to end the drive.  Reinfeldt's 27-yard return and another unnecessary roughness penalty against New England gave the Oilers a first down on the Patriots 49-yard line.  Pastorini completed a 22-yard pass to Barder, and eventually got his team a 21-0 lead with a 13-yard touchdown pass to Barber at the end of the possession.

Pastorini finished the first half with 10 of 12 completions for 184 yards and 3 touchdowns.  He threw only two passes in the second half, both completions.  Meanwhile, Grogan was benched with 18 seconds left in the half, having completed only 3 of 12 passes for 38 yards.

A 30-yard field goal by Toni Fritsch gave the Oilers a 24-0 third quarter lead before New England managed a comeback.  First they drove 75 yards to score on Andy Johnson's 24-yard halfback option play pass to receiver Harold Jackson.  Then in the fourth quarter, they took advantage of a short field due to a poor punt by Cliff Parsley, scoring on Tom Owen's 24-yard touchdown pass to tight end Russ Francis that cut their deficit to 24-14.  However, their efforts were dashed on their drive when linebacker Gregg Bingham intercepted an Owen pass and returned it 19 yards to the Patriot 18-yard line, setting up Campbell's 2-yard touchdown run to put the game away.

Francis caught 8 passes for 101 yards and a touchdown.

This was the Patriots only playoff loss at Foxboro Stadium. They did not lose another home playoff game again until 31 years later, seven years after Gillette Stadium opened.

This was the first postseason meeting between the Oilers and Patriots.

NFC: Los Angeles Rams 34, Minnesota Vikings 10

After the game was tied 10–10 at halftime, the Rams dominated the second half by scoring 24 unanswered points. After the Vikings opened up the scoring with a field goal, Los Angeles marched 59 yards to score on quarterback Pat Haden's 9-yard touchdown pass to Willie Miller. However, Minnesota tied the game 6 seconds before halftime when quarterback Fran Tarkenton threw a 1-yard touchdown to Ahmad Rashad. From that point on, the Rams controlled the rest of the game. After Cullen Bryant gave Los Angeles the lead midway through the third period with a 3-yard touchdown, Haden threw a 27-yard touchdown to Ron Jessie. Meanwhile, the Vikings offense could only manage 58 yards of offense during the second half in what turned out to be Tarkenton's last game of a Hall of Fame career.

This was the fifth postseason meeting between the Vikings and Rams, with Minnesota winning all four previous meetings.

Conference Championships

Sunday, January 7, 1979

AFC: Pittsburgh Steelers 34, Houston Oilers 5

On a wet, slick, and slippery field, the Steelers dominated the Oilers by forcing 9 turnovers and only allowing 5 points. Pittsburgh took the early lead by driving 57 yards to score on running back Franco Harris' 7-yard touchdown run. Then, linebacker Jack Ham recovered a fumble at the Houston 17-yard line, which led to running back Rocky Bleier's 15-yard rushing touchdown.

In the second quarter, a 19-yard field goal by Oilers kicker Toni Fritsch cut the score 14–3, but then the Steelers scored 17 points during the last 48 seconds of the second quarter. First, Houston running back Ronnie Coleman lost a fumble, and moments later Pittsburgh wide receiver Lynn Swann caught a 29-yard touchdown reception. Then Johnnie Dirden fumbled the ensuing kickoff, which led to Steelers wide receiver John Stallworth's 17-yard reception. After the Oilers got the ball back, Coleman fumbled again, and Roy Gerela kicked a field goal to increase Pittsburgh's lead, 31–3. Houston never posed a threat for the rest of the game as they turned over the ball four times in their six second-half possessions.

This was the first postseason meeting between the Oilers and Steelers.

NFC: Dallas Cowboys 28, Los Angeles Rams 0

After a scoreless defensive struggle in the first half (Ram kicker Frank Corral missed two field goals), the Cowboys forced 5 second half turnovers that led to 28 points. With 9:11 left in the third quarter, Dallas safety Charlie Waters intercepted a pass and returned it to the Los Angeles 10-yard line. Five plays later, running back Tony Dorsett, who finished the game with 101 rushing yards, scored on a 5-yard touchdown run to give the Cowboys a 7–0 lead.

With about 4 minutes left in the period, the Rams mounted a threat when Jackie Wallace returned a punt at midfield to the Dallas 23-yard line.  Three plays later at the Dallas 14, Jim Jodat was stopped cold on 4th and a foot by Randy White and Larry Bethea.

As the third quarter neared a close, Waters recorded another interception and returned it to the Rams' 20, setting up quarterback Roger Staubach's 4-yard touchdown pass to Scott Laidlaw 58 seconds into the final period. On Waters' interception, Pat Haden's throwing hand hit Randy White's helmet, breaking his thumb and knocking him out of the game.

At around the 8-minute mark in the 4th, Vince Ferragamo, Haden's replacement, hit Willie Miller on a 65-yard pass to the 10-yard line, but on first and goal Cullen Bryant fumbled (his first in 337 career carries), and Cowboys defensive end Harvey Martin recovered at the 11-yard line. Dallas then marched 89 yards, featuring a 53-yard run on first down by Tony Dorsett and scored on Billy Joe Dupree's 11-yard touchdown catch.  Dorsett had 70 of the drive's 89 yards rushing alone.

The Cowboys closed out the scoring with 1:19 left in the game when linebacker Thomas Henderson intercepted a Ferragamo pass and returned it 68-yards for the final touchdown.

This game was the last playoff game at the Coliseum for the Rams until the 2017 season.

This was the fourth postseason meeting between the Cowboys and Rams, with Dallas winning two of the previous three meetings.

Super Bowl XIII: Pittsburgh Steelers 35, Dallas Cowboys 31

This was the second Super Bowl meeting between the Steelers and Cowboys, where Pittsburgh won the only previous meeting.

References

Total Football: The Official Encyclopedia of the National Football League
The Sporting News Complete Super Bowl Book 1995

National Football League playoffs
Playoffs
Los Angeles Rams postseason